Pedro Stetsiuk (born 17 November 1980) is a Ukrainian born Argentine weightlifter. His best result was the silver medal at the 2007 Pan American Games at the men's 105 kg event.

Major results

Personal life
Stetsiuk was born in Lviv at the Soviet Union, from Ukrainian father and Argentine mother. In 1993 the family moved to Argentina. From 2001 Stetsiuk lived in the United States until beginning of 2007, when he back to Argentina.

References

External links

1980 births
Living people
Ukrainian emigrants to Argentina
Argentine male weightlifters
Weightlifters at the 2007 Pan American Games
Weightlifters at the 2011 Pan American Games
Pan American Games silver medalists for Argentina
Pan American Games medalists in weightlifting
Medalists at the 2007 Pan American Games